Willem Dafoe  is an American actor known for his work in To Live and Die in L.A. (1985), Platoon (1986), The Last Temptation of Christ (1988), Flight of the Intruder (1991), Speed 2: Cruise Control (1997), The Boondock Saints (1999), Shadow of the Vampire (2000), Spider-Man (2002), The Life Aquatic with Steve Zissou (2004), Manderlay (2005), Antichrist (2009), The Florida Project (2017), The Lighthouse (2019) and Spider-Man: No Way Home (2021). 

Dafoe has received multiple awards and nominations, including four Academy Award nominations and has collaborated with filmmakers such as Paul Schrader, Abel Ferrara, Lars von Trier and Wes Anderson.

Film

Television

Video games

References

Dafoe, Willem
Dafoe, Willem